The PAGASA Astronomical Observatory also known as the PAGASA Observatory is an astronomical observatory in Quezon City, Metro Manila, Philippines within the University of the Philippines Diliman campus. Established in 1954 and managed by the Philippine Atmospheric, Geophysical and Astronomical Services Administration (PAGASA), the facility hosts the largest operational telescope in the Philippines.

The facility's Observatory dome hosts a computer-based  Cassegrain reflector telescope which was donated by the Japanese government through a cultural aid grant and installed at site in May 2001. Prior to this period, the Observatory used a  reflector-type telescope. The current telescope is often used for CCD imaging of stars.

The PAGASA Observatory was opened for public use on February 16, 2003, during the start of the National Astronomy Week.

See also
 Manila Observatory

References

Astronomical observatories in the Philippines
Buildings and structures in Quezon City
Tourist attractions in Quezon City
Astronomical Observatory
1954 establishments in the Philippines
University of the Philippines Diliman